Prince Franz Josef of Liechtenstein (Franz Josef Wenceslaus Georg Maria; 19 November 1962 – 28 February 1991), popularly known as Prince Wenzel, was a member of Liechtenstein princely family. He was the youngest son of Franz Joseph II, Prince of Liechtenstein and his wife, Countess Georgina von Wilczek, and thus younger brother of Hans-Adam II, Prince of Liechtenstein.

Biography 
He was born on 19 November 1962, as the youngest son of the former reigning Prince Franz Joseph II and the youngest brother of the current reigning Prince Hans-Adam II. His mother was Countess Georgina of Wilczek. He was known, familiarly, as "Wenzel".

In 1982, he entered the Royal Military Academy Sandhurst, and a year later was a lieutenant in the Grenadier Guards in London. He then studied medicine at the University of Fribourg and the University of Zürich. He worked as an assistant doctor at the Rorschach Hospital.

Suddenly and quite unexpectedly, Prince Wenzel of Liechtenstein died on 28 February 1991 in the guesthouse of Vaduz Castle.

Honours 
 : Recipient of the 70th Birthday Medal of Prince Franz Joseph II.

Ancestry

References 

1962 births
1991 deaths
Princes of Liechtenstein
Graduates of the Royal Military Academy Sandhurst
University of Fribourg alumni
Liechtenstein Roman Catholics
Sons of monarchs